Viridiana (Spanish, Portuguese, Latin), Viridianne (French, English), Verdiana (Italian) is a female given name of Latin origin as well as the name of an Italian saint.

Origin and meaning 
The origin of the female first name Viridiana comes from the Latin word "viridis", meaning "green".

Popularity 
Viridiana has never ranked in the top 1,000 female names outside the United States. It first entered the U.S. baby name popularity charts in 1991 in the 981st spot. By 1997 Viridiana was no longer on the baby name popularity charts, having placed at 934th place the previous year. The highest rank for the name Viridiana in the top 1,000 baby names was in 1995, reaching 784th most popular female name in the U.S..

Variations 
Viria
Viridia
Viridiana
Viridianna
Viridianne

People and projects

Saints 
Verdiana: an Italian/French Saint

Films 
Viridiana: a film by Spanish director Luis Buñuel

Fiction 
Viridiana Sovari: a character from the Night Angel trilogy

People 
Verdiana Masanja (born 1954), Tanzanian mathematician

Italian feminine given names
Spanish feminine given names
Portuguese feminine given names